"I've Been Waiting for You" is a song written by Neil Young, which he recorded for his 1968 debut solo album. In a song review for AllMusic, critic Matthew Greenwald described it as "One of the most powerful and well-crafted songs from Neil Young's self-titled solo debut... A very strong and engaging melody is set against a striking, descending guitar riff, which serves as the song's hook."

Young did not perform the song with Crazy Horse or Crosby, Stills, Nash & Young, although he recorded a live solo acoustic version in November 1968, just a few days before the release of the album version. It was later included on the live album Sugar Mountain – Live at Canterbury House 1968, released in 2008.

David Bowie, the Pixies (B-side of single "Velouria"), and Dinosaur Jr. (unreleased) have recorded renditions of the song.

David Bowie version

David Bowie recorded a version of the song, which features Dave Grohl on guitar, for his album Heathen (2002). His version of "I've Been Waiting for You" was released as a single in Canada and reached number 11 in the single charts.

Tin Machine performed the song during their 1991-92 It's My Life Tour, sung by Reeves Gabrels. One such live version appeared on the Tin Machine Live: Oy Vey, Baby live video release. The song was played live again on Bowie's solo Heathen Tour (2002) and A Reality Tours (2003). A longer version of the album version (3:16 versus 3:00) appeared exclusively on the Heathen SACD.

Track listing
CD: ISO-Columbia / 38K 003369 (Canada)
 "I've Been Waiting for You (album version)" – 3:00
 "Sunday (Tony Visconti mix)" – 4:56
 "Shadow Man" – 4:46

Production and credits
Producers:
David Bowie
 Tony Visconti
Musicians:
David Bowie: vocals, keyboards, synths, guitars, sax, stylophone, drums
Dave Grohl: guitar
Tony Visconti: bass guitar, guitars, recorders, B-vox, string arrangements
Matt Chamberlain: drums, loop programming, percussion
David Torn: guitars, guitar loops, omnichord
Jordan Rudess: piano and Hammond organ.
Gail Ann Dorsey: bass on "Shadow Man"
Earl Slick: ambient guitar on "Shadow Man"
Mark Plati: acoustic guitar on "Shadow Man"
Lisa Germano: violin on "Shadow Man"

References

Neil Young songs
1968 songs
2002 singles
David Bowie songs
Songs written by Neil Young
Song recordings produced by David Bowie
Song recordings produced by Tony Visconti
Song recordings produced by David Briggs (record producer)
Song recordings produced by Neil Young